Bludnovo is a rural locality (a village) in Permasskoye Rural Settlement, Nikolsky District, Vologda Oblast, Russia. The population was 60 as of 2002.

Geography 
Bludnovo is located 20 km south of Nikolsk (the district's administrative centre) by road. Kozlovka is the nearest rural locality.

References 

Rural localities in Nikolsky District, Vologda Oblast
Nikolsky Uyezd